Shut Up And Rap is the third studio album by American rapper Termanology, released on December 9, 2014, through his own record label, ST. Records, Statik Selektah's Showoff Records, and Boston based label Brick Records.

Background
The album includes guest appearances from Artisin, Astro, Chasen Hampton, Chilla Jones, Chris Rivers, Cortez, Doo Wop, Dutch Rebelle, Ea$y Money, H Blanco, Inspectah Deck, Lil Fame, Lumidee, Michael Christmas, Reks, Slaine, Skyzoo, SuperSTah Snuk, Torae, Wais P and Willie The Kid. The album is mostly produced by Billy Loman.

Singles
On October 7, 2014, the first single from the album, "The War Begins" featuring Inspectah Deck, Chris Rivers & H Blanco, was released. The official music video for the single was released on December 1, 2014.
On November 5, 2014, he released the second single "El Wave".
On December 11, 2014, he released the third single "I Fucks With You " featuring Lumidee & Cyrus DeShield. The official music video for the single was released the same day.
On January 13, 2015, he released the fourth single "Get Away" featuring Skyzoo, Torae & Reks. The official music video for the single was released the same day.

Track listing

References

Termanology albums